B. J. Baylor (born September 8, 1998) is an American football running back for the Atlanta Falcons of the National Football League (NFL). He played college football at Oregon State.

Professional career

Green Bay Packers
After going undrafted in the 2022 NFL Draft, Baylor signed with the Green Bay Packers as an undrafted free agent on May 30. He was waived during the first round of training camp cuts.

Atlanta Falcons
On September 15, 2022, the Falcons signed Baylor to the practice squad. He signed a reserve/future contract on January 9, 2023.

References

https://www.atlantafalcons.com/team/players-roster/b-j-baylor/

https://www.espn.com/nfl/player/_/id/4255988/bj-baylor

https://www.buildingthedam.com/2022/4/30/23051287/bj-baylor-signs-udfa-deal-with-the-green-bay-packers

https://www.thefalcoholic.com/2022/9/15/23354124/falcons-sign-rb-b-j-baylor-to-practice-squad

https://nfltraderumors.co/falcons-sign-rb-b-j-baylor-to-practice-squad/#:~:text=Baylor%2C%2024%2C%20signed%20with%20the,the%20first%20round%20of%20cuts.

Living people
American football running backs
Oregon State Beavers football players
1998 births
Atlanta Falcons players
Green Bay Packers players